The white-bellied duiker (Cephalophus leucogaster) is a duiker found in central Africa.  Little is known on the ecology of the species, and only some information on habitat and diet is available.

Duikers are a fairly small species of antelope that originate from, and still reside in, sub-Saharan Africa.

The white-bellied duiker ranges in Cameroon, the Central African Republic, the Republic of the Congo, the Democratic Republic of the Congo, Equatorial Guinea, and Gabon, while it is likely to have been extirpated in Uganda.

References 

white-bellied duiker
Fauna of Central Africa
white-bellied duiker
Taxa named by John Edward Gray